Fraxinus floribunda is a species of ash native to South Asia, East Asia, and Southeast Asia. It is known from Afghanistan, Pakistan, Nepal, Assam, Bhutan, Laos, Myanmar (Burma),  Thailand, Vietnam, the Ryukyu Islands, and parts of China (Guangdong, Guangxi, Guizhou, Xizang, Yunnan, Zhejiang).

Fraxinus floribunda is a medium-sized deciduous tree growing to 10–15 m tall with a trunk up to 50 cm diameter, with grey bark. Leaves opposite, pinnate, with 7–9 serrate leaflets. Flowers white, with petals 3–4 mm long, in large branched clusters up to 25 cm across. Fruit a nut, with a long narrow wing 2.5–4 cm long by 3–4 mm wide.

References

External links
line drawing of Fraxinus floribunda (upper right) and F. insularis (lower left), Flora of China Illustrations vol. 15, fig. 224, 1–3 
Plants for a Future
Flowers of India, Himalayan Ash

floribunda
Trees of Afghanistan
Trees of China
Trees of the Indian subcontinent
Trees of Indo-China
Flora of the Ryukyu Islands
Plants described in 1820